The eighteenth season of Australian reality television series The Block, titled The Block: Tree Change, premiered on 7 August 2022 on the Nine Network. Hosts Scott Cam and Shelley Craft, site foremen Keith Schleiger and Dan Reilly, and judges Neale Whitaker, Shaynna Blaze and Darren Palmer, all returned from the previous season.

Production

Applications for the eighteenth season of the series opened in September 2021 until 18 October 2021, looking for couples aged between 18 and 65 years old being sought by casting agents. Filming is expected to be a 10–12 week shoot period from late February 2022. In September 2021, the eighteenth season of The Block was officially confirmed at Nine’s 2022 upfronts, and for the first time the series will be heading to a regional location, the Macedon Ranges, where the contestants will be transforming country houses.

The Block in 2022 is located on McGeorge Road, in Gisborne, Victoria.

In early April 2022, the day filming was scheduled to commence it was confirmed by sources that a contestant had tested positive to COVID-19. Filming was delayed by a week with filming commencing mid-April.

The Block auctions (or Block-tions) for the houses were held on Saturday, 5 November 2022, with the final episode of 2022 airing the next day on Channel Nine and 9Now at 7:00pm (AEDT) on Sunday, 6 November 2022.

Contestants

This is the ninth season of The Block to have five couples.

Team controversy

Originally in the first 48 hours of the series, there was another team, Joel Patfull & Elle Ferguson, however they left the series abruptly in the first night without notice as they found the series was not “on brand” for them, therefore the team were replaced by Rachel & Ryan. Elle posted on Instagram that reason they left was because of Joel's mother having a bad fall, but the real reason was exposed on the show. Joel and Elle were portrayed as runaways and troublemakers who put in no effort on the show, and they were generally disliked by the public.

Score history

Weekly Room Budget

Weekly Room Prize

Results

Judges' Scores
 Colour key:
  Highest Score
  Lowest Score

Challenge scores

Auction

The Auctions were held on Saturday November 5th, 2022, with the episode being aired the following night. Omar & Oz broke the record for the highest amount of profit ever made in a Block auction, taking home a total profit of $1,686,666.66, which equates to $843,333 each. Meanwhile, the other auctions did not fare so well. High interest rates and inflation lead to the lowest result since 2011, with favourites Tom & Sarah-Jane taking home just $20,000.99. Rachel & Ryan passed in their home and it sold immediately after for $4,249,000.50, netting them a profit of $169,000.50. Ankur & Sharon and Dylan & Jenny followed Rachel & Ryan’s strategy by passing in their homes in hope for a better result down the track. On 11 November, Ankur & Sharon‘s house sold for $4.25 million giving them a profit of $170,000. On 13 February, Dylan and Jenny’s house was sold for an undisclosed amount more than 3 months after auction.

Ratings

Notes

Death

One of the workers, Jon-Jeremy Bradey, passed away earlier in October 2022. He suffered a heart attack and he was 42.

References

2022 Australian television seasons
17